Mike Kuckelman is an American lawyer and politician from Kansas. He served as the chairman of the Kansas Republican Party from February 2019 to February 2023.

Early life
A Catholic, Kuckelman attended the private Maur Hill Prep School. Kuckelman then attended Washburn University receiving a BBA in accounting in 1986. He then attended the Washburn University School of Law receiving a J.D. and admittance to the Kansas Bar in 1990. He than began his legal career first working as an associate at the law firm Blackwell Sanders (now Husch Blackwell) and later as a partner at the law firm Kuckelman-Torline-Kirkland. He specialized in European litigation, spending most of his time in London and was one of the lead attorneys appointed by the United States District Court for the Southern District of New York to litigate the World Trade Center cases after the September 11 attacks.

Political career

Chairman of the Kansas Republican Party
Kuckelman became chairman of the Kansas Republican Party in February 2019 promising to continue the advancement of Republican principles. He was heavily involved in the 2022 Kansas gubernatorial election attacking incumbent Democratic governor Laura Kelly and promising to defeat her soundly. Following Derek Schmidt's defeat with 47.3% to Kelly's 49.5%, Kuckelman moved to punish any Republicans that voted for Dennis Pyle, former Republican and current Independent state senator who ran as an Independent and got 2.03% of the vote, stating that any votes for Pyle where indirect votes for Kelly. This move has been criticized as using Pyle as a scapegoat for the lackluster Schmidt campaign as even if all of Pyle's vote went to Schmidt he would still fall short by 1,806 votes or 0.18% of the electorate. This has resulted in an even larger rift within the Kansas Republican Party, as Kuckelman is now viewed as the face of "establishment politics" that has consistently let down Republican voters and failed to bridge the gap and prevent Pyle from splitting the vote. Several prominent state politicians, including state senators Mark Steffen and Alicia Straub as well as the president of the state senate, Ty Masterson, have denounced Kuckelman and the Kansas GOP leadership. In February 2023 he was replaced as Chairman of the Kansas Republican party by Mike Brown.

Other offices
Kuckelman was selected as a delegate to the 2016, 2020 and most recently the 2024 Republican National Conventions. He also acted as a spokesmen for Kansas City's, and by extension the whole Kansas City metropolitan area's unsuccessful bid to host the 2024 convention.

References

Living people
Washburn University alumni
Washburn University School of Law alumni
Kansas Republicans
Year of birth missing (living people)